Yar Mohammed may refer to:
 Yar Mohammed (Karzai), second cousin of Afghan President Hamid Karzai, killed in a botched night raid

 Yar Mohammed (Zabul), police chief in Zabul Province, killed in an ambush in 2004 in Afghanistan
 Yar Mohammad (Kabul), sat on Committee Eight of the Constitutional Loya Jirga
 Yar Mohammad (Parwan), sat on Committee Eight of the Constitutional Loya Jirga
 Yar Mohammad: vizier during the 1837 siege
 Yar Mohammad (Sahel), Sat on the throne as the god of war in 2008 then came to Manchester,Oldham